Vecna Technologies is a healthcare information technology company with products including the Patient Information Exchange (a patient self-service platform including pre-registration, onsite registration, queuing, clinical messaging, eforms, and business intelligence modules)and QC PathFinder (electronic infection surveillance software). Vecna shares its origin with an independent sister company Vecna Robotics that develops and applies robotics technology to logistics and industrial markets.

History
Vecna was founded to provide consulting and systems integration services to the United States Military Health System and Department of Veterans Affairs. The founders derived the name 'Vecna' from the Czech word věčný, fem. věčná, meaning 'eternal' implying that the company and its products are built to last. Vecna Technologies was founded in 1998 and has offices in Cambridge, Massachusetts. The Greenbelt, Maryland location closed in 2019.

In 2015, Vecna was awarded the Kinetic Process Innovation Award for providing patient self-service technology to Boulder Community Hospital.
In 2015, the Robotics Business Review named Vecna one of the top 50 robotics companies to watch.
In 2014, Vecna was listed as #10 on the list of Top 100 Women-Led Businesses in Massachusetts.
In 2012 the company was awarded the Gold Massachusetts Economic Impact Award for Greater Boston by the Massachusetts Alliance for Economic Development (MassEcon) because of the company's expansion in Massachusetts.

In addition, in 2012, Vecna was named to the Top 100 Women-Led Businesses in Massachusetts by the Boston Business Journal.

In 2011, the Small Business Administration selected Vecna as one of 44 recipients of the Tibbetts Award for driving innovation and creating jobs.

After a series of close partnerships, in 2015, Vecna bought telepresence robot manufacturer VGo Communications and moved employees from Nashua, New Hampshire to Vecna's Cambridge offices. The company then split into Vecna Robotics (Cambridge MA), and Vecna Healthcare (Burlington MA) in 2019.

Products

Patient Information Exchange
Vecna's patient self-service system includes pre-registration, onsite registration, queuing, clinical messaging, eforms, and business intelligence modules.

The platform can be accessed by healthcare kiosks, personal computers and mobile devices. The online application lets patients complete administrative tasks such as scheduling appointments, registering for appointments, paying bills, and exchanging secure messages with providers.  Patients can also view clinical information such as lab results, medication, and patient problem lists. A data exchange platform supports bi-directional data exchange with any brand of hospital EMR/EHR system via a range of interfaces, including HL7, X12, XML and web-services.

Patients review their demographic information, verify insurance coverage, pay bills, and check in at the point-of-service or online. Patients who have completed registration activities online to check in with a barcode.

Queuing manages patient flow and provides administrative oversight. The solution supports audio and visual paging, patient estimated wait times, throughput forecasts, and customizable patient surveys.

The American Hospital Association endorsed Vecna's self-service Patient Kiosk.
 
The Patient Kiosks are also being rolled out across the U.S. to medical centers of the Veteran's Administration.

QC PathFinder

QC PathFinder is electronic infection surveillance software that automatically alerts healthcare professionals of healthcare-acquired infections (HAIs), pharmacy-related safety events, and facilitates reporting infections to the Centers for Disease Control and Prevention National Health Safety Network (NHSN). 

QC PathFinder also automatically generates clinically validated institutional antibiograms that inform clinicians on appropriate antimicrobial choices for pathogens within their hospital.

VGo
Vecna acquired VGo in 2015. VGo is a robotic telepresence device that allows a user to log in from a distant location and to move around and interact with their environment as if they were physically there. VGo is active in the Education, Healthcare, and Business verticals.

Research

Vecna's research and development efforts have been funded by federal and state government grants and contracts, to both the Robotics and Health IT centric groups. 
 
 These grants and contracts were focused on robotics platforms, infection control, antimicrobial stewardship, computer vision and machine learning, development of underwater tool systems, and web applications for pathogen surveillance and consulting time management.

Bear Robot

The sister entity Vecna Robotics developed the Battlefield Extraction-Assist Robot (The Bear™). 
The Bear robot is outfitted with infrared cameras and can be operated remotely. The BEAR robot was originally designed to rescue wounded soldiers from the battlefield.

Vecna Cares
Vecna donates IP to the Vecna Cares Charitable Trust to develop the CliniPAK, a rugged electronic medical record for use by rural and underserved communities.  The CliniPAK is a mobile health record system, including a server and solar charger. Vecna Cares is a 501(c)(3) non-profit organization.

Notes and references

External links
 Official site
 Vecna Cares

Robotics companies of the United States
Health care companies based in Massachusetts
Health care companies established in 1998
1998 establishments in Massachusetts